Salah Said Salim al-Yahyaei (born 17 August 1998), commonly known as Salaah al-Yahyaei, is an Omani footballer who plays playmaker for Qatar SC in Qatar Stars League and the Oman national team.

Career

Club
On 12 January 2022, Al-Yahyaei joined Qatar SC until the end of the season.

International
Al-Yahyaei made his debut for Oman national team in a friendly match on 31 August 2016 against Republic of Ireland. He was included in Oman's squad for the 2019 AFC Asian Cup in the United Arab Emirates.

Career statistics

International

Scores and results list Oman's goal tally first.

References

External links

1998 births
Living people
Omani footballers
Omani expatriate footballers
Oman international footballers
Association football midfielders
Al-Seeb Club players
Fanja SC players
Dhofar Club players
Qatar SC players
Oman Professional League players
Qatar Stars League players
2019 AFC Asian Cup players
Omani expatriate sportspeople in Qatar
Expatriate footballers in Qatar
People from Muscat, Oman